= Jhiriya Kheda =

- village
- Location within Madhya Pradesh Location within India
- Coordinates: 23.2727287°N 77.5339963°E
- Country: India
- State: Madhya Pradesh
- District: Bhopal
- Tehsil: Huzur
- Elevation: 474 m (1,555 ft)

Population (2011)
  - Total: 182
- Time zone: UTC+5:30 (IST)
- ISO 3166 code: MP-IN
- 2011 census code: 482431

Jhiriya Kheda is a village in the Bhopal district of Madhya Pradesh, India. It is located in the Huzur tehsil and the Phanda block.

== Demographics ==
According to the 2011 census of India, Jhiriya Kheda has 42 households. The effective literacy rate (i.e. the literacy rate of population excluding children aged 6 and below) is 63.64%.

Demographics (2011 Census)
	Total	Male	Female
Population	182	97	85
Children aged below 6 years	28	12	16
Scheduled caste	40	22	18
Scheduled tribe	10	4	6
Literates	98	62	36
Workers (all)	88	54	34
Main workers (total)	75	48	27
Main workers: Cultivators	16	9	7
Main workers: Agricultural labourers	0	0	0
Main workers: Household industry workers	1	1	0
Main workers: Other	58	38	20
Marginal workers (total)	13	6	7
Marginal workers: Cultivators	1	0	1
Marginal workers: Agricultural labourers	0	0	0
Marginal workers: Household industry workers	0	0	0
Marginal workers: Others	12	6	6
Non-workers	94	43	51
